Silent Night is a 1996 Action Nigerian Film about robbery whereby a gang was formed by different people. It was directed by Chico Ejiro

The two writers are Zeb Ejiro and Ogenejabor.

Cast 
Lola Adewuyi as Ufuoma Odame
Jerry Ajakaye as Taxi driver
Segun Arinze as Arrow
Ramsey Nouah as Stanley 
Peter Bunor as Chief judge
Matilda Dakoru as Uncle's Wife
Johnson Davidson as Adams
Taiwo Ebikeme as Police
Emmanuel France as Teacher
Alex Usifo as Case Judge and also father of Stanley and older brother   
Joke Silva as mother of Stanley and brother, wife of case Judge 
Kate Henshaw as Ruth

Plot 
Stanley from a wealthy family joined a robbery hang out of boredom and upon recruitment as one of the members of black arrows went for an operation. He had to kill his own brother, Vincent when accidentally his family was raided and he recognized him.The leader of the gang's sister, Ruth is in a relationship with Stanley and it led to pregnancy.Nemesis caught up with black arrow team and they were arrested as well as sentenced to death by firing.

References 

1996 films
Nigerian action films
English-language Nigerian films